John Mathew (by 1469 – 1540/1550), of Shaftesbury, Dorset, was an English mercer and Member of Parliament.

He was a Member (MP) of the Parliament of England for Shaftesbury in 1529.

References

15th-century births
16th-century deaths
English MPs 1529–1536